Suzana Gartner is a lawyer, mediator, and animal advocate. Her legal practice,  Gartner & Associates Animal Law, was the first law firm in Canada to focus exclusively on animal law and the mediation of animal law disputes. Gartner & Associates Animal Law ceased operations in December of 2020.

Gartner serves as the Chair of the Ontario Bar Association’s Animal Law Executive Committee. She is a past member of the Ontario Bar Association’s Alternative Dispute Resolution (ADR) Executive Committee. She sits on the Board of Advisors for Animal Justice Canada. Gartner is also a member of the Jackman Humanities Institute (JHI) working group, ‘Animals in the law and Humanities’ at the University of Toronto.

Gartner is a member in good standing with The Law Society of Upper Canada.

Early life and animal welfare 

Gartner’s journey into animal welfare began as a shelter volunteer. In 2010, a chance encounter led her to an abandoned dog at a Toronto municipal shelter. She regularly walked him, but as days passed, and no one came to claim or adopt him, she realized the implications. She convinced her mother to meet him and that day, he was adopted and found a home.

Saving this one life was her impetus to commit to change the legal system, and work to put an end to the killing of adoptable companion animals.

In 2013, Gartner completed her Master of Laws degree in ADR at Osgoode Hall Law School. Her research combined ADR methods with the field of animal law, and she coined the term, ACAP, Acceptable Companion Animal Philosophy, a balanced approach that recognizes the inherent value and sentience of companion animals, and proposes consensus building as a strategy to amend animal legislation towards ending the plight of homeless companion animals.

Career 
From 2009-2010, Gartner worked for the Ontario Ministry of Labour, in the Dispute Resolution Services Branch, as a mediator intern.

In 2014, Gartner launched Gartner & Associates Animal Law, a law firm that represented clients with animal-related disputes, focused on protecting animals’ interests, and advancing the field of animal law.

Gartner continues to lobby provincial and federal governments to amend animal legislation to improve the conditions for animals across Canada and abroad.

Gartner has an upcoming book, A Voice for Animals, scheduled for publication in Spring 2023 according to a 2022 interview.

Publications and presentations 

Social Impact Authors: How & Why Author Suzana Gartner-Vlaovic Is Helping To Change Our World in the Authority Magazine

Animal People and Human People - The Conflicts that Arise from Their Interaction With Suzana Gartner on the Mediation Station Show podcast

Ontario woman feels abandoned by pet insurer she's paid $30K after coverage on elderly dog drops 30% in CBC News

Dog owner raises concerns about breeder after puppy diagnosed with genetic condition in CBC News

Some jurisdictions have tightened trapping rules in Owen Sound The Sun Times News

Pet Custody Issues on Animal News Magazine

Court rules Ontario animal protection law enforcement regime unconstitutional in Canadian Lawyer

Adjudicator calls for specialized court to tackle pet ownership and custody issues in The Lawyer's Daily

Pets and Animal Law on The Dating and Relationship Show

Pet Mediation on Zoomer Radio Family On Air

The Family Pet: Property or Person in The Lawyer's Daily

When there's a divorce, who gets the family pet? on CBC Here and Now

What happens to the dog when a couple breaks up? in The Toronto Star and Tasha Kheiriddin's show on Talk Radio AM640

Pet Insurance Growing But Read the Fine Print in The Lawyers Weekly

Judge limits Toronto lawyer to two pets in the Law Times News.

‘Animal law: Reducing Euthanasia in City Shelters’ to the Canadian Bar Association.

‘Improving Canadian Federal Anti-Cruelty Legislation’ at the Institute of the Ontario Bar Association's session ‘Current Trends and Important Developments in Animal law’.

‘Pet Custody Disputes: Companion Animals as Sentient Beings,’ in the Newsletter of the Animal Law section of the Ontario Bar Association (November, 2015).

References

External links 
 Website of Gartner’s advocacy and work for animals (https://suzanagartner.com/).
 

Lawyers in Ontario
Canadian women lawyers
Canadian non-fiction writers
Canadian women non-fiction writers
Living people
University of Toronto alumni
Year of birth missing (living people)